Hausa (/;) is a Chadic language spoken by the Hausa people in the northern half of Nigeria, Ghana, Cameroon, Benin and Togo, and the southern half of Niger, Chad and Sudan, with significant minorities in Ivory Coast.

Hausa is a member of the Afroasiatic language family and is the most widely spoken language within the Chadic branch of that family. Ethnologue estimated that it was spoken as a first language by some 47 million people and as a second language by another 25 million, bringing the total number of Hausa speakers to an estimated 72 million.

In Nigeria, the Hausa-speaking film industry is known as Kannywood.

Classification

Hausa belongs to the West Chadic languages subgroup of the Chadic languages group, which in turn is part of the Afroasiatic language family.

Geographic distribution

Native speakers of Hausa, the Hausa people, are mostly found in southern Niger and northern Nigeria. The language is used as a lingua franca by non-native speakers in most of northern Nigeria, southern Niger, northern Cameroon, northern Ghana, northern Benin, northern Togo, southern Chad and parts of Sudan.

By country

Nigeria
In Nigeria, Hausa is dominant throughout the north, but not dominant in the states of Kwara, Kogi and Benue.
Cities in which Hausa is spoken include Kano, Kaduna, Katsina, Daura, Gobir, Zaria, Sokoto, Birnin Kebbi, Gusau, Dutse, Hadejia, Bauchi, Misau, Zamfara, Gombe, Nafada, Maiduguri, Yobe, Yola, Jalingo, Jos, Lafia, Nasarawa, Minna, Kontagora, Lokoja, and Abuja.

Niger
In Niger, Hausa is spoken in the south, including the cities of Maradi, Diffa, Tahoua, Zinder, Tillaberi, Dosso, and Agadez.

Cameroon
In Cameroon, Hausa is spoken in the north, including the cities of Ngaoundere, Garoua, and Maroua.

Ghana
In Ghana, Hausa is spoken in the north. Cities where it is spoken include Tamale, Bolgatanga, and Wa.

Benin
In Benin, Hausa is spoken in the north. Cities where it is spoken include Parakou, Kandi, Natitingou, and Djougou.

Togo
In Togo, Hausa is spoken in the north. Cities where it is spoken include Sokode, Kara, and Dapaong.

Chad
In Chad, Hausa is spoken in the south. Cities where it is spoken include N'Djamena.

Sudan
In Sudan, Hausa is spoken in the states of Jazirah, Blue Nile, and Kordofan.

Dialects
Hausa presents a wide uniformity wherever it is spoken. However, linguists have identified dialect areas with a cluster of features characteristic of each one.

Traditional dialects 
Eastern Hausa dialects include Dauranci in Daura, Kananci in Kano, Bausanci in Bauchi, Gudduranci in Katagum Misau and part of Borno, and Hadejanci in Hadejiya.

Western Hausa dialects include Sakkwatanci in Sokoto, Katsinanci in Katsina, Arewanci in Gobir, Adar, Kebbi, and Zanhwaranci in Zamfara, and Kurhwayanci in Kurfey in Niger. Katsina is transitional between Eastern and Western dialects. Sokoto is used in a variety of classical Hausa literature, and is often known as Classical Hausa.

Northern Hausa dialects include Arewa (meaning 'North') and Arewaci.

Zazzaganci in Zazzau is the major Southern dialect.

The Daura (Dauranchi) and Kano (Kananci) dialect are the standard.  The BBC, Deutsche Welle, Radio France Internationale and Voice of America offer Hausa services on their international news web sites using Dauranci and Kananci. In recent language development Zazzaganci took over the innovation of writing and speaking the current Hausa language use.

Northernmost dialects and loss of tonality 
The western to eastern Hausa dialects of Kurhwayanci, Damagaram and Adarawa, represent the traditional northernmost limit of native Hausa communities. These are spoken in the northernmost sahel and mid-Saharan regions in west and central Niger in the Tillaberi, Tahoua, Dosso, Maradi, Agadez and Zinder regions. While mutually comprehensible with other dialects (especially Sakkwatanci, and to a lesser extent Gaananci), the northernmost dialects have slight grammatical and lexical differences owing to frequent contact with the Zarma, Fula, and Tuareg groups and cultural changes owing to the geographical differences between the grassland and desert zones. These dialects also have the quality of bordering on non-tonal pitch accent dialects.

This link between non-tonality and geographic location is not limited to Hausa alone, but is exhibited in other northern dialects of neighbouring languages; example includes differences within the Songhay language (between the non-tonal northernmost dialects of Koyra Chiini in Timbuktu and Koyraboro Senni in Gao; and the tonal southern Zarma dialect, spoken from western Niger to northern Ghana), and within the Soninke language (between the non-tonal northernmost dialects of Imraguen and Nemadi spoken in east-central Mauritania; and the tonal southern dialects of Senegal, Mali and the Sahel).

Ghanaian Hausa dialect 
The Ghanaian Hausa dialect (Gaananci), spoken in Ghana and Togo, is a distinct western native Hausa dialect-bloc with adequate linguistic and media resources available. Separate smaller Hausa dialects are spoken by an unknown number of Hausa further west in parts of Burkina Faso, and in the Haoussa Foulane, Badji Haoussa, Guezou Haoussa, and Ansongo districts of northeastern Mali (where it is designated as a minority language by the Malian government), but there are very little linguistic resources and research done on these particular dialects at this time.

Gaananci forms a separate group from other Western Hausa dialects, as it now falls outside the contiguous Hausa-dominant area, and is usually identified by the use of c for ky, and j for gy. This is attributed to the fact that Ghana's Hausa population descend from Hausa-Fulani traders settled in the zongo districts of major trade-towns up and down the previous Asante, Gonja and Dagomba kingdoms stretching from the sahel to coastal regions, in particular the cities of Accra (Sabon Zango, Nima), Takoradi and Cape Coast

Gaananci exhibits noted inflected influences from Zarma, Gur, Jula-Bambara, Akan, and Soninke, as Ghana is the westernmost area in which the Hausa language is a major lingua-franca among sahelian/Muslim West Africans, including both Ghanaian and non-Ghanaian zango migrants primarily from the northern regions, or Mali and Burkina Faso. Ghana also marks the westernmost boundary in which the Hausa people inhabit in any considerable number. Immediately west and north of Ghana (in Cote d'Ivoire, and Burkina Faso), Hausa is abruptly replaced with Dioula–Bambara as the main sahelian/Muslim lingua-franca of what become predominantly Manding areas, and native Hausa-speakers plummet to a very small urban minority.

Because of this, and the presence of surrounding Akan, Gbe, Gur and Mande languages, Gaananci was historically isolated from the other Hausa dialects. Despite this difference, grammatical similarities between Sakkwatanci and Ghanaian Hausa determine that the dialect, and the origin of the Ghanaian Hausa people themselves, are derived from the northwestern Hausa area surrounding Sokoto.

Hausa is also widely spoken by non-native Gur, and Mandé Ghanaian Muslims, but differs from Gaananci, and rather has features consistent with non-native Hausa dialects.

Other native dialects 
Hausa is also spoken in various parts of Cameroon and Chad, which combined the mixed dialects of Northern Nigeria and Niger. In addition, Arabic has had a great influence in the way Hausa is spoken by the native Hausa speakers in these areas.

Non-native Hausa 

In West Africa, Hausa's use as a lingua franca has given rise to a non-native pronunciation that differs vastly from native pronunciation by way of key omissions of implosive and ejective consonants present in native Hausa dialects, such as ɗ, ɓ and kʼ/ƙ, which are pronounced by non-native speakers as d, b and k respectively. Another difference between native and non-native Hausa is the omission of vowel length in words and change in the standard tone of native Hausa dialects (ranging from native Fulani and Tuareg Hausa-speakers omitting tone altogether, to Hausa speakers with Gur or Yoruba mother tongues using additional tonal structures similar to those used in their native languages). Use of masculine and feminine gender nouns and sentence structure are usually omitted or interchanged, and many native Hausa nouns and verbs are substituted with non-native terms from local languages.

Non-native speakers of Hausa numbered more than 25 million and, in some areas, live close to native Hausa. It has replaced many other languages especially in the north-central and north-eastern part of Nigeria and continues to gain popularity in other parts of Africa as a result of Hausa movies and music which spread out throughout the region.

Hausa-based pidgins

There are several pidgin forms of Hausa. Barikanchi was formerly used in the colonial army of Nigeria. Gibanawa is currently in widespread use in Jega in northwestern Nigeria, south of the native Hausa area.

Phonology

Consonants
Hausa has between 23 and 25 consonant phonemes depending on the speaker.

The three-way contrast between palatalized velars , plain velars , and labialized velars  is found only before long and short , e.g.  ('grass'),  ('to increase'),  ('shea-nuts'). Before front vowels, only palatalized and labialized velars occur, e.g.  ('jealousy') vs.  ('side of body'). Before rounded vowels, only labialized velars occur, e.g.  ('ringworm').

Glottalic consonants
Hausa has glottalic consonants (implosives and ejectives) at four or five places of articulation (depending on the dialect). They require movement of the glottis during pronunciation and have a staccato sound.

They are written with modified versions of Latin letters. They can also be denoted with an apostrophe, either before or after depending on the letter, as shown below.

 ɓ / b', an implosive consonant, sometimes ;
 ɗ / d', an implosive , sometimes ;
 ch', an ejective  (does not occur in Kano dialect)
 ƴ / 'y is a palatal approximant with creaky voice, found in only a small number of high-frequency words (e.g.  "children",  "daughter"). Historically it developed from palatalized .

Vowels

Hausa vowels occur in five different vowel qualities, all of which can be short or long, totaling 10 monophthongs. In addition, there are four diphthongs, giving a total number of 14 vocalic phonemes.

 Monophthongs Short (single) vowels: .  Long vowels: .

 Diphthongs .

Tones
Hausa is a tonal language. Each of its five vowels may have low tone, high tone or falling tone. In standard written Hausa, tone is not marked. In recent linguistic and pedagogical materials, tone is marked by means of diacritics.

  – low tone: grave accent

  – falling tone: circumflex

An acute accent may be used for high tone, but the usual practice is to leave high tone unmarked.

Morphology
Except for the Zaria and Bauchi dialects spoken south of Kano, Hausa distinguishes between masculine and feminine genders.

Hausa, like the rest of the Chadic languages, is known for its complex, irregular pluralization of nouns. Noun plurals in Hausa are derived using a variety of morphological processes, such as suffixation, infixation, reduplication, or a combination of any of these processes. There are 20 plural classes proposed by Newman (2000).

Pronouns
Hausa marks tense differences by different sets of subject pronouns, sometimes with the pronoun combined with some additional particle. For this reason, a subject pronoun must accompany every verb in Hausa, regardless of whether the subject is known from previous context or is expressed by a noun subject.

Writing systems

Boko (Latin)
Hausa's modern official orthography is a Latin-based alphabet called boko, which was introduced in the 1930s by the British colonial administration.

The letter ƴ (y with a right hook) is used only in Niger; in Nigeria it is written ʼy.

Tone and vowel length are not marked in writing. So, for example,  "from" and  "battle" are both written daga.

Ajami (Arabic)
Hausa has also been written in ajami, an Arabic alphabet, since the early 17th century. The first known work to be written in Hausa is Riwayar Nabi Musa by Abdullahi Suka in the 17th century. There is no standard system of using ajami, and different writers may use letters with different values. Short vowels are written regularly with the help of vowel marks, which are seldom used in Arabic texts other than the Quran. Many medieval Hausa manuscripts in ajami, similar to the Timbuktu Manuscripts, have been discovered recently; some of them even describe constellations and calendars.

In the following table, short and long e are shown along with the Arabic letter for t.

Other systems

Hausa is one of three indigenous languages of Nigeria which has been rendered in braille.

At least three other writing systems for Hausa have been proposed or "discovered". None of these are in active use beyond perhaps some individuals.

 A Hausa alphabet supposedly of ancient origin and in use in north of Maradi, Niger.
 A script that apparently originated with the writing/publishing group Raina Kama in the 1980s.
 A script called "Tafi" proposed in the 1970s(?)

See also

 Hausa people
 History of Niger
 History of Nigeria
 Kanem Empire
 Bornu Empire
 Bayajidda

References

Bibliography

 Philips, John Edward . “Hausa in the Twentieth Century: An Overview.” in Sudanic Africa, vol. 15, 2004, pp. 55–84. online, on Romanization of the language.

 
 
 
  (Now in the public domain).

External links

 
 Omniglot
 Hausa Language Acquisitions at Columbia University Libraries
 Hausa Vocabulary List –World Loanword Database
 Hausa Dictionary at University of Vienna
 Hausar Yau Da Kullum: –Intermediate and Advanced Lessons in Hausa Language and Culture
 Hausa News and Blog at the University of Ahmadu bello university also visit www.dariyamedia.com for more info about hausa culture and people 

 
Fusional languages
Subject–verb–object languages
Languages of Benin
Languages of Burkina Faso
Languages of Cameroon
Languages of Ghana
Languages of Niger
Languages of Nigeria
Languages of Sudan
Languages of Togo
Languages of Ivory Coast